The Backstreet is a gay leather bar on the Mile End Road in London's East End. It is London's longest running, and only remaining leather bar, having opened in April 1985. In 2019, it was saved from redevelopment by Tower Hamlets Council, which stated that the redevelopment would "harm the long-term provision of a nightclub that serves the LGBT+ community".

References 

LGBT nightclubs in London
Leather bars and clubs
Leather subculture
London Borough of Tower Hamlets